Lincoln Township is a township in Perkins County, South Dakota, USA.  As of the 2000 census, its population was 174.

References

Townships in Perkins County, South Dakota
Townships in South Dakota